Baji Prabhu Deshpande ( 1615–1660) was a warrior, commander of Chhatrapati Shivaji Maharaj in the Maratha Kingdom. In 17th century he fought the Battle of Pavan Khind at Ghodh khind against the invading army of Siddi Jauhar of Bijapur's Adil Shah.  

In 17th century after King Shivaji killed Adil Shah's general Afzal Khan in a meeting near Pratapgad and defeated large army in the subsequent battle. Shah sent his general Siddi Jauhar to subdue Shivaji I, Jauhar besiege the  Panhala fort which is situated on a mountain. After many months King Shivaji with his soldiers slipped from besiege. To avoid capture Baji Prabhu and his 300 soldiers defended the narrow mountain pass then known as Ghod khind. Due to it Shivaji able to reach at safe fort. Baji Prabhu Despande martyred in the battle. 

He also was a landlord or Vatandar in maval region.

His character appeared in many films, television show, books and novels. In 2022 Bollywood movie Har Har Mahadev, Sharad Kelkar played Baji.

Early life 
Baji Prabhu was 15 years older than Shivaji Maharaj, which indicates he was born around 1615. He was born in a Marathi Prabhu (Chandraseniya Kayastha Prabhu) family. Earlier he worked under Krishnaji Bandal of Rohida near Bhor. After Shivaji Maharaj defeated Krishnaji at Rohida and captured the fort and many commanders along with Bajiprabhu joined Chatrapati Shivaji Maharaj.

Battle of Pavan Khind

After defeating Afzal Khan and the rout of the Bijapuri army at Pratapgad, chatrapati Shivaji maharaj continued to push deep into Bijapuri territory. Within a few days, the Marathas captured Panhala fort (near the city of Kolhapur). Meanwhile, another Maratha force, led by Netaji Palkar, pushed straight on towards Bijapur. Bijapur repulsed this attack, forcing Chhatrapati Shivaji maharaj, some of his commanders and soldiers to retreat to Panhala fort.

The Bijapuri force was led by Siddhi Johar, an Abyssinian general. Discovering Shivaji Maharaj's location, Johar laid siege to Panhala. Netaji Palkar made repeated attempts to break the Bijapuri siege from outside, but these failed.

Finally, a risky plan was put into action: Chhatrapati Shivaji Maharaj, Baji Prabhu Deshpande with a select band of troops would attempt to break through the siege at the night, and make for Vishalgad. In order to deceive the Bijapuri forces, to avoid a chase if they found out that Chhatrapati Shivaji Maharaj had broken the siege, Shiva Kashid a barber by profession, who had an uncanny physical resemblance to Shivaji Maharaj, volunteered to dress like the king and let himself be captured.

On a stormy full moon's night (night of Guru Pournima, Ashadh Paurnima) 600 men led by Baji Prabhu and Shivaji Maharaj, broke through the siege. They were pursued by the Bijapuri force. As planned, Shiva Kashid allowed himself to be captured and taken back to the Bijapuri camp, guessing that he would be put to death once the charade was discovered. This gave the fleeing Maratha force some breathing space.

As soon as the Bijapuri force realized their mistake, the chase was on again, led by Siddhi Masood, the son-in-law of Siddhi Johar. Near the pass of Ghodkhind (Horse's Pass), the Marathas made a final stand. Shivaji Maharaj and half of the Maratha force pushed for Vishalgadh, while Baji Prabhu, his brother Phulaji and the remaining Bandal Sena of a few hundred men blocked the pass and fought against 10000 Bijapuri soldiers in the Ghodkhind Pass for more than 18 hours.

Tradition and myth, describe feats of bravery shown by the Marathas during this rear-guard action. Baji Prabhu used a weapon called "Dand Patta". Through the battle, Baji Prabhu, though apparently heavily injured, continued fighting, inspiring his men to fight on until Shivaji Maharaj's safe journey to Vishalgadh was signaled by the firing of three cannon volleys. It should be mentioned that when Shivaji Maharaj approached Vishalgad with 300 men, the fort was already under siege by Bijapuri sardars named Suryarao Surve and Jaswantrao Dalvi. Shivaji Maharaj with his 300 men had to defeat Surve to reach the fort.

The Ghodkhind pass was subsequently named Pavan Khind ("Holy Pass") by Shivaji Maharaj, in honor of the sacrifice of Baji Prabhu and his troops.

Descendants 

Baji Prabhu's vatan was situated around Parhar budruk village in Haridas maval region in western Maharashtra, his descendents still live in the area. Anathor branch of his family live in Bhor village. They have been continuing the glorious heritage of their great ancestors. Vishnu Narayan Deshpande, 10th decendant and former Sarapanch of Parhar bk, was a great freedom fighter. His wife Latika Deshpande was relative of the author Ram Ganesh Gadkari. The family has relationship with the family of Rango Bapuji Gupte. Vishnu Deshpande had four sons and four daughters. His son Dilip Deshpande champions the cause of dam affected displaced people and their rehabilitation. Farming is their family business. The whole family does social work and is aware of the great legacy handed down by previous generations..
One of Baji Prabhu's descendant, Ramchandra Kashinath Deshpande, was an Indian freedom fighter against the British rule, educationalist and social activist who worked in Dhule, Jalgaon, and Pune for encouraging education. He participated in the Quit India Movement during the British rule and was imprisoned for 19 months in the Kolhapur Central Jail. He was felicitated after Independence by the then Prime Minister Indira Gandhi. For his social work he was given the title of ‘Special Executive Magistrate’ by the Maharashtra government in 1989.

In popular culture 
In 1909, Sri Aurobindo composed an English poem titled Baji Prabhou, describing his heroic sacrifice at the battle at the Panhala Fort.
 Baji Prabhu Deshpande, an Indian silent film on the warrior was made by Baburao Painter in 1929. Another silent film, Veer Baji, released in the same year and was produced by Omkar Films.
 Indian independence activist and politician Vinayak Damodar Savarkar wrote a Ballad on Baji Prabhu but it was banned by the colonial British government. This ban was lifted on May 24th, 1946.
 Baji Prabhu's character featured Raja Shivchatrapati tv series of Star Pravah in 2000s.
 Ajinkya Deo portrayed Baji Prabhu in 2021 series Jai Bhawani Jai Shivaji aired on Star Pravah.
 A Marathi-language film, Pawankhind, directed by Digpal Lanjekar and starring Ajay Purkar as Baji Prabhu Deshpande, was released on 18 February 2022.
 Har Har Mahadev, a film directed by Abhijit Deshpande, starring Sharad Kelkar as Baji Prabhu Deshpande and produced by Zee Studios released 25 October 2022 in 5 language (Hindi, Tamil, Telugu and Kannada, along with Marathi).

See also
Tanaji Malusare, another Sardar known for his bravery at Battle of Kondhana (1670).
Netaji Palkar, Sardar Senapati (Commander-in-Chief) of Shivaji .

References

External links

 A history of the Maratha people p.168-171
 Full text of "Ethnographical notes on Chandraseniya Kayastha Prabhu"

 
 17th-century soldiers
People from Maharashtra
People of the Maratha Empire
Indian military leaders
1615 births
1660 deaths